Ocean is the eighth studio album by American country pop trio Lady Antebellum, and the final one released under that name before it was shortened to "Lady A". The album was released on November 15, 2019, through BMLG Records. This is their first album with the label, and first to be produced by Dann Huff. A deluxe edition of the album was released November 20, 2020 under their name "Lady A".

Background
In August 2018, Lady Antebellum signed with BMLG Records after their recording contract with Capitol Nashville ended. In March 2019, while performing in London, the trio announced that they were working on new music.

Singles
"What If I Never Get Over You" was released on May 17, 2019, as the album's lead single. The song debuted at number 14 on the Hot Country Songs chart, and at number 25 on the Country Airplay chart. As of September 2019, it has sold 68,000 units in the United States. The song topped the Country Airplay chart in January 2020, becoming their first number one since 2014.

The title track was released on September 20, 2019 as a promotional single, and was sent to adult contemporary radio as the album's second single on October 7, 2019.

"What I'm Leaving For" was released as a promotional single on October 25, 2019 and was released to country radio on February 18, 2020 as the third official single. A ballad about leaving one's family to go to work, it was later pulled from radio in the wake of the COVID-19 pandemic.

"Pictures", "Boots", and "Be Patient with My Love" were also released as promotional singles ahead of the album.

Commercial performance
Ocean debuted at number two on the US Top Country Albums earning 29,000 equivalent album units (including 21,000 copies as pure album sales) in its first week, according to Nielsen Music. The album also debuted at number 11 on the US Billboard 200 chart, becoming the group's first album to miss the top-ten. As of February 2020, the album has earned with 172,000 album-equivalent units in the US. As of March 2020, the album has sold 62,400 copies in the United States.

Track listing
Adapted from Taste of Country and Lady Antebellum's Instagram.

Personnel
Adapted from AllMusic

Lady Antebellum
Dave Haywood – acoustic guitar, background vocals, banjo, creative director, keyboards, mandolin, resonator guitar, harmonica
Charles Kelley – background vocals, creative director, lead vocals
Hillary Scott – background vocals, creative director, lead vocals

Additional musicians

David Angell – violin
Monisa Angell – viola
David Davidson – violin 
Stuart Duncan – fiddle
Conni Ellisor – violin 
Paul Franklin – steel guitar
Dann Huff – accordion, acoustic guitar, banjo, bass guitar, bouzouki, dobro, Fender Rhodes, resonator guitar, Hammond B3, keyboards, mandolin, percussion, piano, soloist, synthesizer, synthesizer piano, synthesizer strings
Charlie Judge – Hammond B3, keyboards, lap steel guitar, piano, synthesizer piano, synthesizer strings
Anthony La Marchina – cello
Elizabeth Lamb – viola

Little Big Town – featured artist
Gordon Mote – piano
Carole Rabinowitz – cello
Jimmie Lee Sloas – bass
Aaron Sterling – drums, percussion
Ilya Toshinskiy – acoustic guitar, banjo, dobro, resonator guitar, mandolin, soloist
Derek Wells – electric guitar 
Kris Wilkinson – string arrangement
Kristin Wilkinson – viola
Karen Winkleman – violin
Alex Wright – Hammond B3, steel guitar, Wurlitzer

Production

Adam Ayan – mixing
Drew Bollman – engineer
Nathan Chapman – programming 
Ross Copperman – programming 
Cory Crowder – programming 
Shawn Daugherty – assistant
Josh Ditty – assistant 
Parker Foote – graphic design 
Mike "Frog" Griffith – production coordination
Dann Huff – digital editing, producer, programming
Charlie Judge – programming 

Seth Morton - engineer
Abby Murdock - graphic design 
Joshua Sage Newman – graphic design 
Justin Niebank – mixing, programming 
Ryon Nishimori – graphic design 
Doug Rich – copy coordination
Dove Shore - photography 
Chris Small – digital editing
Janice Soled – copy coordination
Ben West – programming 
Alex Wright – programming

Charts

Weekly charts

Year-end charts

References

2019 albums
Lady A albums
Big Machine Records albums
Albums produced by Dann Huff